Alexey Victoravich Ignashov (born 18 January 1978) is a Belarusian Heavyweight kickboxer. He is a four-time Muay Thai World champion, K-1 World GP 2003 in Paris and K-1 World GP 2001 in Nagoya tournament champion. As of 2011 he is living in Auckland, New Zealand and training at Balmoral Lee Gar Gym under Lollo Heimuli.

Biography
He is best known for his knee strikes, notably used to score knockout wins over Badr Hari, Semmy Schilt, Nicholas Pettas, and Carter Williams. Ignashov is considered by his fans to be one of the most talented and technically sound heavyweight kickboxers in the world. However, he is also considered by many as frustratingly inconsistent, occasionally appearing lackluster or inactive in the ring, such as in his K-1 Final quarterfinal match against Peter Aerts in 2003. He suffered a knee injury in a fight against Bjorn Bregy in 2005. Since then, his performance has diminished.

Ignashov trained in the Chinuk gym for 11 years, before immigrating to New Zealand in 2006.

He has beaten the best kickboxers in the world, including decision wins over three times K-1 champions Remy Bonjasky and Peter Aerts and knockout highlight reel wins over two currently best kickboxers in the world Semmy Schilt and Badr Hari. He has also fought legendary Rob Kaman, losing by decision, but after that fight Rob gave the trophy to Ignashov.
Despite all those huge wins, he has lost some bouts where he was a huge favorite.
He was TKO'd only two times, each time because of injury, against Bjorn Bregy in 2005 and in his 2009 bout against 2003 French Kickboxing champion Freddy Kemayo.

After 5 years of being out of the major ring events Iggy was granted his wish to return to K-1 in April 2010 against Badr Hari, having one of the best chins in the sport.
However he was very inactive in the ring and lost by unanimous decision. He was heavily criticized by the fans after the fight. Ignashov announced that he wants to have a rubber match with Badr Hari after he has a few more K-1 fights to get used to the big ring again. Just recently he competed in his 99 official fight while winning with Freddy Kemayo. He made his comeback after one year at 12 May 2012 in Budapest Hungary losing a decision against Ali Cenik.

He defeated Zinedine Hameur-Lain via decision in Kazan, Russian on 20 October 2012. Just a week later, he was defeated by Tomáš Hron by unanimous decision at Nitrianska Noc Bojovnikov in Nitra, Slovakia.

He was scheduled to fight Benjamin Adegbuyi on 10 November 2012 in Craiova, Romania, in the quarter-finals of the SuperKombat World Grand Prix 2012 Final Elimination. Unfortunately, due a broken finger he had to pull out of the event.

On 23 February 2013, he defeated the overmatched Martynas Knyzlis on points in Moscow, Russia.

Ignashov had his rubber match with Badr Hari at Legend 2: Invasion in Moscow on 9 November 2013, losing by unanimous decision in yet another lackluster fight.

Ignashov was slated to fight Andonis "Wrangler" Tzoros in Greece for the WKN K-1 Super Heavyweight Championship on 26 April 2015. Ignashov defeated Tzoros and won the WKN title via decision.

Titles

Professional
World Kickboxing Network
 2015 WKN International K-1 Rules Super-heavyweight Championship
K-1
 2003 K-1 World Grand Prix 2003 in Paris Champion
 2001 K-1 World Grand Prix 2001 in Nagoya Champion
 2000 K-1 Belarus Grand Prix 2000 Champion
International Sport Karate Association
 2000 ISKA World Heavyweight Champion
 1999 ISKA World Heavyweight Champion
World Muaythai Council
 2000 WMC Muay Thai World Heavyweight Champion
 1999 WMC Muay Thai World Heavyweight Champion
World Professional Kickboxing League
 2000 WPKL Muay Thai European Champion

Amateur
 1999 I.A.M.T.F. Amateur Muay Thai World Championships  -91 kg
 1997 European Amateur Muay Thai Heavyweight Champion  -91 kg

Kickboxing record (Incomplete)

|-
|-  bgcolor="FFBBBB"
| 2018-05-30 || Loss ||align=left|  Valentin Bordianu || Zhara Fight Show || Moscow, Russia || Decision (Unanimous) || 3 || 3:00
|-
|-  bgcolor="#CCFFCC"
| 2018-04-06 || Win ||align=left| Dževad Poturak || Bellator Kickboxing 9|| Hungary || Decision (Split) || 3 || 3:00
|-
|-  bgcolor="#CCFFCC"
| 2015-04-26 || Win ||align=left| Antonis Tzoros || The Battle|| Athens, Greece || Decision || 3 || 3:00
|-
! style=background:white colspan=9 |
|-
|-  bgcolor="FFBBBB"
| 2013-11-09 || Loss ||align=left| Badr Hari || Legend 2: Invasion || Moscow, Russia || Decision (Unanimous) || 3 || 3:00
|-
|-  bgcolor="#CCFFCC"
| 2013-02-22 || Win ||align=left| Martnyas Knyzlis || Knockout Show || Moscow, Russia || Decision || 3 || 3:00
|-
|-  bgcolor="FFBBBB"
| 2012-10-27 || Loss ||align=left| Tomáš Hron || Nitrianska Noc Bojovnikov || Nitra, Slovakia || Decision (Unanimous) || 3 || 3:00
|-
|-  bgcolor="#CCFFCC"
| 2012-10-20 || Win ||align=left| Zinedine Hameur-Lain || Tatneft Arena World Cup 2012 Final || Kazan, Russia || Decision (Unanimous) || 3 || 3:00
|-
|-  bgcolor="#CCFFCC"
| 2012-07-07 || Win ||align=left| Corneliu Rus || SUPERKOMBAT World Grand Prix III 2012, Super Fight || Varna, Bulgaria || Decision (Unanimous) || 3 || 3:00 
|-
|-  bgcolor="FFBBBB"
| 2012-05-12 || Loss ||align=left| Ali Cenik || Fight Code Dragons Final 32, Prestige Fight || Budapest, Hungary || Decision (Unanimous) || 3 || 3:00 
|-
|-  bgcolor="#CCFFCC"
| 2011-02-05 || Win ||align=left| Roman Kleibl || Fight Code Rhinos Series || Nitra, Slovakia || Decision || 3 || 3:00 
|-
|-  bgcolor="FFBBBB"
| 2010-12-11 || Loss ||align=left| Tomáš Hron || Yiannis Evgenikos presents: It's Showtime Athens || Athens, Greece || Decision (4–1) || 3 || 3:00
|-
|-  bgcolor="#CCFFCC"
| 2010-05-21 || Win ||align=left| Freddy Kemayo || K-1 World Grand Prix 2010 in Bucharest Semi Finals || Bucharest, Romania || Decision (Unanimous) || 3 || 3:00
|-
! style=background:white colspan=9 |
|-
|-  bgcolor="#CCFFCC"
| 2010-05-21 || Win ||align=left| Mindaugas Sakalauskas || K-1 World Grand Prix 2010 in Bucharest Quarter Finals || Bucharest, Romania || KO || 1 || 1:57
|-
|-  bgcolor="#FFBBBB"
| 2010-04-03 || Loss ||align=left| Badr Hari || K-1 World Grand Prix 2010 in Yokohama || Yokohama, Japan || Decision (Unanimous) || 3 || 3:00
|-
|-  bgcolor="#CCFFCC"
| 2009-10-24 || Win ||align=left| Ron Sparks || K-1 ColliZion 2009 Final Elimination || Arad, Romania || KO (Right High Kick) || 2 || 2:13
|-
|-  bgcolor="#FFBBBB"
| 2009-10-17 || Loss ||align=left| Semmy Schilt || Ultimate Glory 11: A Decade of Fights || Amsterdam, Netherlands || Decision (Unanimous) || 3 || 3:00
|-
|-  bgcolor="#FFBBBB"
| 2009-06-26 || Loss ||align=left| Freddy Kemayo || Gala International Multi-boxes à Coubertin || Paris, France || TKO (Doctor Stoppage/Shin Injury) || 4 || 2:00
|-
|-  bgcolor="#FFBBBB"
| 2009-05-16 || Loss ||align=left| Roman Kleibl || K-1 ColliZion 2009 Mlada Boleslav || Mlada Boleslav, Czech Republic || Ext.R Decision (Unanimous) || 4 || 3:00
|-
|-  bgcolor="#CCFFCC"
| 2009-02-28 || Win ||align=left| Dzevad Poturak || K-1 Rules Tournament 2009 in Budapest || Budapest, Hungary || Ext.R Decision (Unanimous) || 4 || 3:00
|-
|-  bgcolor="#CCFFCC"
| 2008-10-05 || Win ||align=left| Bjorn Bregy || K.O. Events "Tough Is Not Enough" || Rotterdam, Netherlands || Decision (Unanimous) || 3 || 3:00
|-
|-  bgcolor="#CCFFCC"
| 2008-03-30 || Win ||align=left| Yang Rae Yoo || The Khan 1 || Seoul, South Korea || Decision (Majority) || 3 || 3:00
|-
|-  bgcolor="#FFBBBB"
| 2008-02-09 || Loss ||align=left| Gregory Tony || KO World Series 2008 Auckland || Auckland, New Zealand || Decision (Unanimous) || 3 || 3:00
|-
|-  bgcolor="#CCFFCC"
| 2007-02-24 || Win ||align=left| Attila Karacs || K-1 European League 2007 Hungary || Budapest, Hungary || KO (Left Cross) || 1 || 2:02
|-
|-  bgcolor="#CCFFCC"
| 2006-08-12 || Win ||align=left| Imani Lee || K-1 World Grand Prix 2006 in Las Vegas II Quarter Finals || Las Vegas, Nevada, USA || Decision (Split) || 3 || 3:00
|-
! style=background:white colspan=9 |
|-
|-  bgcolor="#FFBBBB"
| 2006-05-13 || Loss ||align=left| Gokhan Saki || K-1 World Grand Prix 2006 in Amsterdam Semi Finals || Amsterdam, Netherlands || Decision (Unanimous) || 3 || 3:00
|-
|-  bgcolor="#CCFFCC"
| 2006-05-13 || Win ||align=left| Petr Vondráček || K-1 World Grand Prix 2006 in Amsterdam Quarter Finals || Amsterdam, Netherlands || KO (Right Cross) || 2 || 2:08
|-
|-  bgcolor="#CCFFCC"
| 2006-02-25 || Win ||align=left| Gary Goodridge || K-1 European League 2006 in Budapest || Budapest, Hungary || Decision || 3 || 3:00
|-
|-  bgcolor="#FFBBBB"
| 2005-09-23 || Loss ||align=left| Remy Bonjasky || K-1 World Grand Prix 2005 in Osaka – Final Elimination || Osaka, Japan || Ext.R Decision (Unanimous) || 4 || 3:00
|-
! style=background:white colspan=9 |
|-
|-  bgcolor="#FFBBBB"
| 2005-05-27 || Loss ||align=left| Noboru Uchida || K-1 World Grand Prix 2005 in Paris || Paris, France || Decision (Majority) || 3 || 3:00
|-
|-  bgcolor="#FFBBBB"
| 2005-04-30 || Loss ||align=left| Peter Graham || K-1 Battle of Anzacs II || Auckland, New Zealand || 2nd Ext.R Decision (Unanimous) || 5 || 3:00
|-
|-  bgcolor="#FFBBBB"
| 2005-02-13 || Loss ||align=left| Bjorn Bregy || Mix Fight Gala || Alkmaar, Netherlands || TKO (Knee Injury) || 3 || 3:00
|-
|-  bgcolor="#CCFFCC"
| 2004-11-06 || Win ||align=left| Paul Slowinski || Titans 1st || Kitakyushu, Japan || Decision (Unanimous) || 3 || 3:00
|-
|-  bgcolor="#FFBBBB"
| 2004-09-25 || Loss ||align=left| Kaoklai Kaennorsing || K-1 World Grand Prix 2004 Final Elimination || Tokyo, Japan || Ext.R Decision (Split) || 4 || 3:00
|-
! style=background:white colspan=9 |
|-
|-  bgcolor="#CCFFCC"
| 2004-07-16 || Win ||align=left| Josip Bodrozic || Kings of Oceania 2004 || Auckland, New Zealand || KO || 1 || N/A
|-
|-  bgcolor="#CCFFCC"
| 2004-06-06 || Win ||align=left| Arthur Williams || K-1 World Grand Prix 2004 in Nagoya || Nagoya, Japan || KO (Low Kicks) || 1 || 1:48
|-
|-  bgcolor="#CCFFCC"
| 2004-05-20 || Win ||align=left| Semmy Schilt || It's Showtime 2004 Amsterdam || Amsterdam, Netherlands || KO (Left Knee Strike) || 1 || 1:20
|-
|-  bgcolor="#CCFFCC"
| 2004-04-11 || Win ||align=left| Cyrille Diabate || MT ONE || Saint-Pierre, Réunion || Decision || 5 || 3:00
|-
|-  bgcolor="#CCFFCC"
| 2004-03-27 || Win ||align=left| Carter Williams || K-1 World Grand Prix 2004 in Saitama || Saitama, Japan || KO (Knee Strike) || 2 || 2:42
|-
|-  bgcolor="#CCFFCC"
| 2004-10-31 || Win ||align=left| Marc de Wit || K-1 Marseilles 2004 World Qualification || Marseilles, France || Decision (Unanimous) || 3 || 3:00
|-
|-  bgcolor="#FFBBBB"
| 2003-12-06 || Loss ||align=left| Peter Aerts || K-1 World Grand Prix 2003 Quarter Finals || Tokyo, Japan || Ext.R Decision (Unanimous) || 4 || 3:00
|-
|-  bgcolor="#CCFFCC"
| 2003-10-31 || Win ||align=left| Josip Bodrozic || K-1 Final Fight Stars War in Zagreb || Zagreb, Croatia || Decision (Split) || 5 || 3:00
|-
|-  bgcolor="#CCFFCC"
| 2003-10-11 || Win ||align=left| Mike Bernardo || K-1 World Grand Prix 2003 Final Elimination || Osaka, Japan || KO (Right Punch and Right Low Kick) || 2 || 2:21
|-
! style=background:white colspan=9 |
|-
|-  bgcolor="#CCFFCC"
| 2003-07-13 || Win ||align=left| Jan Nortje || K-1 World Grand Prix 2003 in Fukuoka || Fukuoka, Japan || KO (Low Kicks) || 1 || 2:49
|-
|-  bgcolor="#CCFFCC"
| 2003-06-14 || Win ||align=left| Cyril Abidi || K-1 World Grand Prix 2003 in Paris Final || Paris, France || TKO (Corner Stoppage) || 3 || 0:20
|-
! style=background:white colspan=9 |
|-
|-  bgcolor="#CCFFCC"
| 2003-06-14 || Win ||align=left| Alexander Ustinov || K-1 World Grand Prix 2003 in Paris Semi Finals || Paris, France || Decision (Split) || 3 || 3:00
|-
|-  bgcolor="#CCFFCC"
| 2003-06-14 || Win ||align=left| Pavel Majer || K-1 World Grand Prix 2003 in Paris Quarter Finals || Paris, France || KO || 3 || N/A
|-
|-  bgcolor="#CCFFCC"
| 2003-06-08 || Win ||align=left| Badr Hari || It's Showtime 2003 Amsterdam || Amsterdam, Netherlands || KO (Right Cross) || 3 || 2:55
|-
|-  bgcolor="#FFBBBB"
| 2002-10-05 || Loss ||align=left| Stefan Leko || K-1 World Grand Prix 2002 Final Elimination || Saitama, Japan || Ext.R Decision (Unanimous) || 4 || 3:00
|-
! style=background:white colspan=9 |
|-
|-  bgcolor="#CCFFCC"
| 2002-07-14 || Win ||align=left| Peter Aerts || K-1 World Grand Prix 2002 in Fukuoka || Fukuoka, Japan || Decision (Majority) || 5 || 3:00
|-
|-  bgcolor="#CCFFCC"
| 2002-05-25 || Win ||align=left| Bjorn Bregy || K-1 World Grand Prix 2002 in Paris || Paris, France || KO (Kick) || 5 || 2:12
|-
|-  bgcolor="#CCFFCC"
| 2002-02-24 || Win ||align=left| Nobu Hayashi || K-1 World Grand Prix 2002 Preliminary Netherlands || Arnhem, Netherlands || Decision (Unanimous) || 5 || 3:00
|-
|-  bgcolor="#FFBBBB"
| 2001-10-21 || Loss ||align=left| Francisco Filho || K-1 World Grand Prix 2001 Semi Finals || Tokyo, Japan || Decision (Unanimous) || 3 || 3:00
|-
|-  bgcolor="#CCFFCC"
| 2001-10-21 || Win ||align=left| Nicholas Pettas || K-1 World Grand Prix 2001 Quarter Finals || Tokyo, Japan || KO (Right Knee) || 2 || 1:21
|-
|-  bgcolor="#FFBBBB"
| 2001-10-21 || Loss ||align=left| Jerrel Venetiaan || It's Showtime - Original || Haarlem, Netherlands || Decision || 5 || 3:00
|-
|-  bgcolor="#CCFFCC"
| 2001-07-20 || Win ||align=left| Lloyd van Dams || K-1 World Grand Prix 2001 in Nagoya Final || Nagoya, Japan || Ext.R Decision (Unanimous) || 4 || 3:00
|-
! style=background:white colspan=9 |
|-
|-  bgcolor="#CCFFCC"
| 2001-07-20 || Win ||align=left| Andrew Thomson || K-1 World Grand Prix 2001 in Nagoya Semi Finals || Nagoya, Japan || KO (Left Punch) || 1 || 1:46
|-
|-  bgcolor="#CCFFCC"
| 2001-07-20 || Win ||align=left| Petar Majstorovic || K-1 World Grand Prix 2001 in Nagoya Quarter Finals || Nagoya, Japan || Decision (Unanimous) || 3 || 3:00
|-
|-  bgcolor="#CCFFCC"
| 2001-04-21 || Win ||align=left| Paris Vasilikos || K-1 Italy Grand Prix 2001 Preliminary || Milan, Italy || TKO (Jaw Injury) || 3 || 3:00
|-
|-  bgcolor="#FFBBBB"
| 2001-02-04 || Loss ||align=left| Stefan Leko || K-1 Holland GP 2001 in Arnhem || Arnhem, Netherlands || DQ || 5 || 3:00
|-
|-  bgcolor="#CCFFCC"
| 2000-12-12 || Win ||align=left| Lloyd van Dams || It's Showtime - Christmas Edition || Haarlem, Netherlands || TKO (Exhaustion) || 5 || 3:00
|-
|-  bgcolor="#FFBBBB"
| 2000-08-20 || Loss ||align=left| Matt Skelton || K-1 World Grand Prix 2000 in Yokohama Quarter Finals || Yokohama, Japan || Decision (Unanimous) || 3 || 3:00
|-
|-  bgcolor="#CCFFCC"
| 2000-06-24 || Win ||align=left| Sergey Arhipov || K-1 Belarus Grand Prix 2000 Final || Minsk, Belarus || TKO || 3 || N/A
|-
! style=background:white colspan=9 |
|-
|-  bgcolor="#CCFFCC"
| 2000-06-24 || Win ||align=left| Sergei Matkin || K-1 Belarus Grand Prix 2000 Semi Finals || Minsk, Belarus || KO || 2 || 2:01
|-
|-  bgcolor="#CCFFCC"
| 2000-06-24 || Win ||align=left| Darius Grilauskas || K-1 Belarus Grand Prix 2000 Quarter Finals || Minsk, Belarus || KO || 1 || 2:32
|-
|-  bgcolor="#CCFFCC"
| 2000-06-04 || Win ||align=left| Marc de Wit || Night of Revenge || Haarlem, Netherlands || Decision || 5 || 3:00
|-
|-  bgcolor="#CCFFCC"
| 2000-05-06 || Win ||align=left| Mark Russell || Oktagon || Milan, Italy || N/A || N/A || N/A
|-
! style=background:white colspan=9 |
|-
|-  bgcolor="#CCFFCC"
| 2000-03-13 || Win ||align=left| Jörgen Kruth || Night Club "Reaktor" || Minsk, Belarus || Decision (Unanimous) || 5 || 3:00
|-
! style=background:white colspan=9 |
|-
|-  bgcolor="#CCFFCC"
| 2000-01-23 || Win ||align=left| Harry Hooft || Day of No Mercy || Rotterdam, Netherlands || Decision || 5 || 3:00
|-
! style=background:white colspan=9 |
|-
|-  bgcolor="#FFBBBB"
| 1999-10-24 || Loss ||align=left| Rob Kaman || It's Showtime - It's Showtime || Haarlem, Netherlands || Decision || 5 || 3:00
|-
|-  bgcolor="#CCFFCC"
| 1999-07-29 || Win ||align=left| Jörgen Kruth || Rajamangala Stadium || Bangkok, Thailand || KO || 2 || N/A 
|-
! style=background:white colspan=9 |

|-  bgcolor="#CCFFCC"
| 1998-04-26 || Win ||align=left| Remy Bonjasky || W.P.K.L. Muay Thai Fight Night || Netherlands || Decision (Unanimous) || 3 || 2:00 
|-
|-
| colspan=9 | Legend:    

|-  bgcolor="#CCFFCC"
| 1999-03-13 || Win ||align=left| Jorgan Himmerstall || I.A.M.T.F World Muay thai Championships, final|| Bangkok, Thailand || || || 
|-
! style=background:white colspan=9 |
|-
|-  bgcolor="#CCFFCC"
| 1999-03-11 || Win ||align=left| Daniel Ghiţă || I.A.M.T.F World Muay thai Championships, semi final|| Bangkok, Thailand || Decision || 4 || 2:00
|-  bgcolor="#CCFFCC"
| 1999-03-10 || Win ||align=left| Lubos Vanata || I.A.M.T.F World Muay thai Championships, quarter final|| Bangkok, Thailand || || || 
|-
| colspan=9 | Legend:

Mixed martial arts record

|Loss 
|align=center|1–1 (1)
| Shinsuke Nakamura 
|Submission (forearm choke) 
|K-1 MMA ROMANEX 
| 
|align=center|2 
|align=center|1:51
|Saitama, Japan 
|
|-
|Win 
|align=center|1–0 (1)
| Steve Williams 
|KO (knees) 
|K-1 Beast 2004 in Niigata 
| 
|align=center|1 
|align=center|0:22
|Niigata, Japan 
|
|-
|NC
|align=center|0–0 (1)
| Shinsuke Nakamura 
|NC (overturned)
|K-1 PREMIUM 2003 Dynamite!! 
| 
|align=center|3 
|align=center|1:19
|Nagoya, Japan 
|
|-

See also 
List of K-1 champions
List of male kickboxers

References

External links

Profile at K-1

Belarusian male kickboxers
Heavyweight kickboxers
Belarusian male mixed martial artists
Heavyweight mixed martial artists
Mixed martial artists utilizing Muay Thai
Mixed martial artists utilizing kickboxing
Belarusian Muay Thai practitioners
Sportspeople from Minsk
Belarusian expatriates in New Zealand
Belarusian expatriate sportspeople in Russia
1978 births
Living people
Fighters trained by Lolo Heimuli
SUPERKOMBAT kickboxers